The Japan women's national under-20 football team is a national association football youth team of Japan and is controlled by the Japan Football Association.

The nickname of Japan women's national under-20 football team is the Young Nadeshiko (ヤングなでしこ).

Results and fixtures

Legend

2023
 Fixtures & Results (W U-19 2023), JFA.jp

2022

 Fixtures & Results (WU-20), JFA.jp

Coaching staff

Current coaching staff

Players

Current squad

U-20
The following players were called up on 12 July 2022 for the 2022 FIFA U-20 Women's World Cup, held in Costa Rica in August 2022.

U-19
The following players were called up on 3 March 2023 for a training camp, held from 6 to 9 March at the JFA Dream Field. Raika Okamura (Urawa Reds) withdrew from the squad with an injury.

Previous squads
FIFA U-20 World Cup
2002 FIFA U-19 World Championship
2008 FIFA U-20 World Cup
2010 FIFA U-20 World Cup
2012 FIFA U-20 World Cup
2016 FIFA U-20 World Cup
2018 FIFA U-20 World Cup
2022 FIFA U-20 World Cup
AFC U-20 Women's Asian Cup

Competitive record

FIFA U-20 Women's World Cup

*Draws include knockout matches decided on penalty kicks.

* (2016) France win after extra time.
* (2022) Japan won after winning on penalty shoot-out.

AFC U-20 Women's Asian Cup

* Draws include knockout matches decided on penalty kicks.

Sud Ladies Cup

See also

Women's
International footballers
National football team (Results)
National under-20 football team
National under-17 football team
National futsal team
Men's
International footballers
National football team (Results (2020–present))
National under-23 football team
National under-20 football team
National under-17 football team
National futsal team
National under-20 futsal team
National beach soccer team

References

External links
 Official website, JFA.jp 
 Japan national team 2021 schedule at JFA.jp 

Asian women's national under-20 association football teams
Football